Tony Mendes (born August 10, 1977) is an American  former professional rodeo cowboy who specialized in bull riding.

Background
Mendes was born in Reno, Nevada on August 10, 1977. He continued to live in Reno and then in Jensen, Utah. He is the younger brother of Scott Mendes, who was the 1997 PRCA World Champion bull rider, and a co-founder of the PBR. Tony started riding at age three on top of a sheep. Over the years, he progressed from sheep to calves and steers, before climbing on his first bull at age 14. Tony was recorded to be 5' 10", and 170 pounds during competition.

Career
Tony was the 1996 Professional Rodeo Cowboys Association (PRCA) Bull Riding Rookie of the Year, and competed in that organization in 1996, 1998 to 1999, 2008 to 2009, 2011 and 2012. He also competed in Bull Riders Only (BRO), the Professional Bull Riders (PBR), and Championship Bull Riding (CBR). He qualified for his first PBR World Finals in 1999 and recorded a 93.5 score atop the 1900-pound Clayton's Pet of Double J Rodeo Palace in the short-go. He was often referred to as the "Wild Man" because of the energy he displayed.

Tony qualified for the PRCA’s National Finals Rodeo twice (1998 & 1999) and the PBR World Finals eight times (1999 to 2005, 2007). His brother Scott also qualified for the PBR World Finals in 1994 and 2001, the latter case marking the only time that both brothers qualified for a world championship event together. Tony also qualified for the CBR World Finals in 2012.

Tony’s last professional bull riding out was at the PBR Velocity Tour event in Portland, Oregon in early 2015.

Personal life
On January 2, 2008, Tony was featured on the CBS game show Power of 10. He was defeated without winning any money. He was featured in Bullrider, a documentary by Josh Aronson. Mendes is married to Jolene, with whom he has four children. The Mendes' reside in Fruita, Colorado, as of 2019.

References

Sources

External links
 Tony Mendes VS Tommy Gun - YouTube
 Tony Mendes vs Lights Out - 00 PBR Finals (90 pts) - YouTube

Living people
1977 births
Sportspeople from Reno, Nevada
People from Uintah County, Utah
Contestants on American game shows
Bull riders